Snow Valley Ski Club is a ski area located in Edmonton, Alberta, near the Whitemud Freeway at 119 Street in Rainbow Valley. The resort functions as a not-for-profit organization. The slope caters primary to beginner skiers and snowboarders, with only 15% of the area designated as advanced. 

It has one pulse quad chairlift, one triple chairlift, and two magic carpets. Snow Valley also has a variety of features and man-made jumps in their beginner and advanced terrain parks.

History
Snow Valley was opened in 1961 by members of the Eskimo Ski Club. The original lodge was built in 1972 with two rope tows. In 1981 a T-bar replaced one of the rope tows, and limited snow making was added to extend the ski season. In 1988 a Triple chairlift was installed, along with expanded snow making capability. A significant amount of landfill was completed on the North Hill, where the  present-day terrain park is located.

During the summer of 1995, Snow Valley management took over responsibilities of the adjacent Rainbow Valley Campground. The campground operates in the summer off season. 

A new  lodge was constructed in 2001, replacing the old lodge and maintenance buildings. Additionally in 2001 the first magic carpet was added. A second magic carpet replaced the handle tow in 2003. 

In 2008, Snow Valley opened a first-of-its-kind high-speed 'pulse' quad chair. This chair replaced the t-bar and opened up more terrain.

Summer Activities 
During the off season, the Snow Valley Ski Club not-for-profit operates several seasonal summer attractions. Only attractions that have been present for over 3 years are included in the list below.

Snow Valley Aerial Park 
The Snow Valley Aerial Park is a 15m (50ft) tall aerial-adventure tower built by German-based company Kristall Turm and operated by Snow Valley Ski Club. The tower was the first of its kind built in Canada though there are now several Kristall Turm towers in the country. The Snow Valley Aerial Park features approximately 100 Edmonton-themed features and was opened to the public in 2017.

Rainbow Valley Campground 
The Rainbow Valley Campground ins a long-running campground in Alberta, opened sometime before the 1970's, as the Whitemud Creek Mine operation (which closed in 1970) was described as immediately adjacent to the campground. The Rainbow Valley Campground today has over 75 sites and is open from May until October.

See also
List of ski areas and resorts in Canada

References

External links
 Snow Valley

Ski areas and resorts in Alberta
Sports venues in Edmonton
1961 establishments in Alberta